Kotas, also  Kothar or  Kov by self-designation, are an ethnic group who are indigenous to the Nilgiris mountain range in Tamil Nadu, India. They are one of the many tribal people indigenous to the region. (Others are the Todas, Irulas and Kurumbas). Todas and Kotas have been subject to intense anthropological, linguistic and genetic analysis since the early 19th century. Study of Todas and Kotas has also been influential in the development of the field of anthropology. Numerically Kotas have always been a small group not exceeding 1,500 individuals spread over seven villages for the last 160 years. They have maintained a lifestyle as a jack of all trades such as potters, agriculturalist, leather workers, carpenters, and black smiths and as musicians for other groups. Since the British colonial period they have availed themselves of educational facilities and have improved their socio-economic status and no longer depend on the traditional services provided to make a living. Some anthropologists have considered them to be a specialized caste as opposed to a tribe or an ethnic group.

Kotas have their own unique language that belongs to the Dravidian language family but diverged from South Dravidian sub family at some time in BCE. Their language was studied in detail by Murray Barnson Emeneau, a pioneer in the field of Dravidian linguistics. Their social institutions were distinct from mainstream Indian cultural norms and had some similarities to Todas and other tribal people in neighbouring Kerala and the prominent Nair caste. It was informed by a fraternal polygyny where possible.  Kota religion was unlike Hinduism and believed in non-anthropomorphic male deities and a female deity. Since the 1940s, many mainstream Hindu deities also have been adopted into the Kota pantheon and temples of Tamil style have been built to accommodate their worship. They’ve had specialized groups of priests to propitiate their deities on behalf of the group.

Identity
The Indian government considers them to be a scheduled tribe (ST), a designation reserved for indigenous tribal communities throughout India that are usually at a lower socio-economic status than mainstream society. They also have a special status as a Primitive Tribal Group (PTG) based on certain socio economic and demographic indicators. But the Kotas are a relatively successful group that makes its living as agriculturalists, doctors, post masters and availing themselves of any government and private sector employment. Few anthropologists and local community members consider them to be a service caste placed in Nilgiris to service others but Kotas consider themselves to be original inhabitants of the region and do not accept the servile status. The name Kota is a term applied to the group by outsiders; Kotas refer to themselves as 'Kov'. There are number of meanings attributed to the term, but according to Emeneau, GUND meant a male potter and PEMOG a female potter. Since the 1930s through the efforts of a Kota school teacher, social reformer and activist named Sulli Kota and his followers, Kotas have transformed their previous traditional relationships away from serving other so called high prestige ethnic groups and upgraded their socio-economic status. They still observe their traditional practices.

History

Although many theories have been put forth as to the origins of Kotas and Todas, none have been confirmed as factual. What linguists and anthropologists agree is that ancestors of both Kotas and Todas may have entered the Nilgiris massif from what is today Kerala or Karnataka in centuries BCE and developed in isolation from the rest of the society. According to F. Metz, a missionary, Kotas had a tradition that alluded to them coming over from a place called Kollimale in Karnatakas. They seem to have displaced the previous Kurumba inhabitants from the higher altitudes to lower altitude infested with malarial mosquitoes.

The Kota tribe shows the maternal haplogroup M frequency of 97%, which is one of the highest in India.  Within M haplogroup, M2 lineages are common amongst Dravidian speaking populations of South India. They also demonstrate very low admixture rate from other neighbouring groups. The studies on the hematological parameters of Kota showed that they have a low MCV (mean corpuscular volume) even though there in no trace of anemia. However it is also suggested that there is a probability for G6PD deficiency among this group.

At some point in their history they developed a symbiotic economic relationship with their buffalo rearing Toda neighbours as service providers in return for Todas' buffalo milk, hides, ghee, and meat. They also had a trading and ritual relationship with Kurumba and Irula neighbours who were cultivators and hunter-gatherers. They specifically used the Kurumbas as their sorcerers and as village guards. Origin myth of Kotas postulates that Kotas, Todas, and Kurumbas were all placed in the Nilagiris area at once as brothers by the Kota god. This symbiotic relationship survived until disturbed by the British colonial officers starting in the early 19th century.

Since the early 19th century, missionaries, British bureaucrats, anthropologists and linguists of both Western and Indian kind have spent an enormous amount of time studying the different ethnic and tribal groups; of all, the Todas were the most studied, followed by Kotas. Other groups such as Irulas and various groups of Kurumbars were least studied. The study of the ethnic groups of Nilgiris was instrumental in the early development of the field of Anthropology. Although most groups lived in peace with each other and had developed a symbiotic relationship, taboos and cultural practices were developed to maintain social distance. According to F. Metz, as the original settlers of the highland, Kurumbars were subject to continuous violence including occasional massacres by the Todas and Badagas. According to Kota informants, they had supplied battle drums during periods of war.

Society
Kotas were observed to be domiciled in seven relatively large nuclear villages intercepted between Toda and Badaga settlements. Six villages were within the Nilgiris district in Tamil Nadu and the seventh one in the Wayanad district in Kerala. Kota villages are known as Kokkal in their language and as Kotagiri by outsiders. Each village had three exogamous clans of similar name. Each clan settled in a street called Kerr or Kerri. Clan members were prohibited from marrying within each within the same village but could from the same clan or any other clan from non-native village. The relationship between similarly named clans was unknown and no social hierarchy was evident amongst the inter and intra village clans.

Women’s position
Women had a greater say in choosing their marriage partners than in any mainstream Indian villages and also helped out in many economic activities. They had the right to divorce. They were also exclusively engaged in making pottery. According to early western observers, unlike Toda women, who were friendly towards visitors to their villages, Kota women maintained their distance from outsiders. Wives of Kota priests played equally important ritual role in religious functions. Women who became possessed to flute music are called Pembacol and were consulted during important village decisions. Women also had specialized roles associated with cultivation, domestic chores and social functions.

Food
Unlike Todas, Kotas ate meat and were in good physical condition when met by early anthropologists. Their traditional food is a type of Italian millet known as vatamk. Vatamk is served in almost all ceremonial occasions but rice is the preferred daily food. It is served with udk, a  sambar like item made of locally available pulses, vegetables and tamarind juice. Beef is seldom eaten but eggs, chicken and mutton are consumed, when available, along with locally grown vegetables and beans.

Governance
Prior to colonial era penetration of the Kota area there was very little if not no formal relationships between neighbouring political entities and Kota villages. It is assumed that political entities from Karnataka made forays into the highland but their control was not permanent. Kotas are the head of the nilgiri. There was no formal differentiation that existed within and outside the village level. Each village had an expectation to meet. The village of Thichgad is famous for its women's song and dance, the funerals are well known in Menad, and the Kamatraya festival and instrumental music are famous in Kolmel. Kota village is led by a village headman called Goethgarn. The Goethgarn from Menad was the head of all the seven villages. Whenever a dispute arose, the Goethgarn will call a meeting known as a kuttim with the village elders and decide the solutions. Within a village, the Goethga-rn and elders decide when festivals are to be held and how to solve problems in the community. Although regular justice is handled through the Indian judicial system, local decisions of Kota cultural requirements are handled by the village kut.

Religion
Kota religion and culture revolved around the smithy. Their major deities are A-yno-r also divided into big or Doda-ynor or small or kuna-yno-r, a father god and Amno-r or mother goddess. Father god is also called Kamati-cvara or Kamatra-ya in some villages. Although there were two male gods, there was only one version of the female goddess. These gods were worshiped in the form of Silver disks at specific temples. Historian Joyti Sahi and L. Dumont notes these deities may have roots in proto-Shaivism and proto-Shaktism

Kotas had a number of religious festivals during the colonial precontact and immediately after the colonial contact period. It ranged from praying to their rain god Kannatra-ya or titular deity Kamatra-ya. During the seed sowing ceremony, they used to build a forge and a furnace within the main temple and smiths would make avocatory item like axes or gold ornaments to the deity. The head priest mundika-no-n and headmen gotga-rn usually belong to the particular family (kuyt) and it was passed from father to son. Mundika-no-n is assisted by the te-rka-ran, through whom the god (so-ym) communicates with the people while being possessed. Te-rka-ran could come from any family but mundika-no-n comes from a specific family in a village.

Kota funeral rites consist of two ceremonies. The first one is called Green funeral and concerns cremation of the body. The second ceremony is called a dry funeral and involves exhumation of buried bones from the first ceremony, followed by sacrifice of semi wild buffaloes. The second funeral is no longer practiced widely. Kota temples are unique in being run by a variety of people not restricted to original priestly families.

Language
Kotas speak the Kota language or Ko-v Ma-nt and it is closely related to Toda language. It was identified as an independent Dravidian language in as early as 1870s by Robert Caldwell. It diverged from the common South Dravidian stock in years BCE. Kota language speakers became isolated and the language developed certain unique characteristics that were studied in detail and by the prominent Dravidian linguists Murray Emeneau. It is informed by maintenance of words that shows strong affinity to Archaic Tamil. According to Emeneau Kotas have been living isolated since their separation from the mainstream Tamil speakers in years BCE. Emeneau dates the split to the 2nd century BCE as terminus ante quem ("limit before which") and was unable to date the period earlier than this in which the split may have happened, but it happened after Kannada split from the common Tamil–Kannada stock.

All Nilgiri languages show areal influence and show affinity to each other. Since the reorganization of linguistic states in India, most Kota children study in Tamil at schools and are bilingual in Kota and Tamil. Previously Kotas were multilingual in Kota, Toda and Badaga languages.

Kota kinship terms

See also
Adivasi

Notes

^ Jump up to: a b Mohanty, p. 305
^ Emeneau 1980, p. 240
^ Mandelbaum 1971, p. 470
^ Reddy & Balaji Rao 2004, p. 05
^ Jump up to: a b Metz 1856, p. 112
^ Metz 1856, p. 107
^ Jump up to: a b Dhavendra Kumar 2004, p. 74
^ Singh 2004, p. 54
^ http://www.ajbpr.com/issues/volume2/issue4/FINAL%2014.pdf
^ Emeneau 1984, pp. 212–213
^ Reddy & Balaji Rao 2004, pp. 5–8
^ Jump up to: a b c d e Watson & Kaye 1875, pp. 433–436
^ Hockings 2008, pp. 1–16
^ Metz 1856, pp. 107–109
^ Mandelbaum 1941, pp. 574–583
^ Mandelbaum 1941, p. 24
^ Mandelbaum 1941, p. 20
^ Mandelbaum 1941, p. 23
^ Jump up to: a b Wilson 2003, pp. 97–99
^ Mandelbaum 1938, p. 576
^ Sahi, Jyoti (1 July 1990). The child and the serpent: reflections on popular Indian symbols. Canada: Penguin Group. p. 194. . Retrieved 10 March 2019.
^ Tattvāloka, Volume 16. Sri Abhinava Vidyatheertha Educational Trus. 1993. p. 246.
^ "'A Folk Deity of Tamil Nad' by L. Dumont, in Religion in India ed. T.N. Madan". Archived from the original on 2011-02-24. Retrieved 2019-03-10.
^ Tribhuwan 2003, pp. 175–176
^ Poduval, R. Vasudeva (1990). Travancore Inscription: A Topographical List. New Delhi: Asian Educational Services. p. 76. .
^ Caldwell 1875, p. 512
^ Jump up to: a b Emeneau 1994, pp. 389
^ Emeneau 1980, pp. 78–85
^ Emeneau 1994, pp. 391–392

Cited literature

Further reading

External links
Pictures and Videos of Kotas
Handicrafts of Kota people
Ethnologue: Kota, A language of India

Indigenous peoples of South Asia
Dravidian peoples
Social groups of Tamil Nadu